Oncidium bicolor is a species of orchid ranging from northeastern Venezuela to Brazil.

History 

Discovered in 1843, Oncidium bicolor was published in "Edwards's Botanical Register 29: 66" by John Lindley.

References

External links 

bicolor
Orchids of Brazil
Orchids of Venezuela